The 1922 Norwegian Football Cup was the 21st season of the Norwegian annual knockout football tournament. The tournament was open for all members of NFF. Frigg were the defending champions, but were eliminated by Moss in the fourth round. Last years losing finalist, Odd won their eighth title, having beaten Kvik (Fredrikshald) in the final.

Second round

|}

Third round

|}

Fourth round

|}

Quarter-finals

|}

Semi-finals

|}

Final

See also
1922 in Norwegian football

References

Norwegian Football Cup seasons
Norway
Football Cup